Buback is a German surname. Notable people with the surname include:

Michael Buback (born 1945), German chemist and professor
Siegfried Buback (1920–1977), German prosecutor, father of Michael Buback 

German-language surnames